Cyclophora unocula is a moth in the  family Geometridae. It is found in South Africa and Tanzania.

References

Moths described in 1897
Cyclophora (moth)
Insects of Tanzania
Moths of Africa